The Provisional Siberian Government was a short-lived government in Siberia created by the White movement in 1918.

History

At the beginning of 1918, a Provisional Siberian Government (PSG) was established in the eastern coastal city of Vladivostok. Most of the members of this first Siberian provisional government were members of the Socialist-Revolutionary Party (PSR), including the head of this government, Pyotr Derber.

On 1 June 1918, the West Siberian Commissariat was announced following the Revolt of the Czechoslovak Legion. According to William Henry Chamberlin, "...the initiative in setting up a new government was taken by three men, Markhov, Mikhailov and Lindberg, who described themselves as representatives of the Siberian Government and members of the All-Russian Constituent Assembly, and by the head of the Tomsk Zemstvo, Sidorov." On 30 June a new government took place through the efforts of the more conservative groups and army officers. According to Chamberlin, "The first sign of a swing to the right was the replacement of the Commissariat, which had been guided in its activities by the programme of the Socialist Revolutionary Party, by a group of Ministers of the Derber Government, headed by Pyotr Vologodsky, a jurist with the reputation of a moderate liberal." Autonomous Siberia's flag was green and white to symbolize the snows and forests. On 4 July, this Siberian government declared itself as the sole Siberian authority.

The Derber government in Vladivostok refused to recognize the legitimacy of this new government based in Omsk. A reorganization of the Vladivostok government followed, with the name Provisional Government of Autonomous Siberia (PGAS) adopted. The PGAS in Vladivostok and new PSG in Omsk refused to recognize the other, and each claimed for themselves the mantle as the sole government of Siberia. The generals of the Siberian Army placed their allegiance with the Vologodskii government in Omsk, however, leading to the marginalization of the Vladivostok regime.

In September 1918, after the State Meeting in Ufa, the Provisional Siberian Government (Omsk) was transitioned into a new government, the Ufa Directory, or Provisional All-Russian Government. Chamberlin states, "Vologodsky went to Eastern Siberia and obtained the abdication of the phantom Derber Cabinet in Vladivostok."

In November 1918, a coup took place in Omsk and installed Alexander Kolchak as the Supreme Ruler of Russia.

Sources

Additional Reading
 "Гражданская война в России: катастрофа Белого движения в Сибири" ("Civil War in Russia: Catastrophe of White Movement in Siberia") - Moscow, "AST" Publishing House, 2005. 

Siberian Government (Omsk)
Siberian Government (Omsk)
Provisional governments of the Russian Civil War
States and territories established in 1918
1918 disestablishments in Asia
History of Siberia